Bruce Almighty (or stylized as BruceALMIGHTY) is a 2003 American fantasy comedy film directed by Tom Shadyac and written by Steve Koren, Mark O'Keefe and Steve Oedekerk. The film stars Jim Carrey as Bruce Nolan, a down-on-his-luck television reporter who complains to God (played by Morgan Freeman) that he is not doing his job correctly and is offered the chance to try being God himself for one week. The film is Shadyac and Carrey's third collaboration, as they had worked together previously on Ace Ventura: Pet Detective in 1994 and Liar Liar in 1997—the second of three collaborations between Carrey and Baker Hall after The Truman Show in 1998 and the next being Mr. Popper's Penguins in 2011. It co-stars Jennifer Aniston, Philip Baker Hall and Steve Carell (credited as Steven Carell in the film).

When released in American theaters on May 23, 2003, Bruce Almighty opened to mixed reviews from critics, but was a box-office success and grossed $86.4 million, making it the top Memorial Day opening weekend of any film in history at the time. The film surprised the industry's pundits when it beat The Matrix Reloaded the following weekend.

Evan Almighty, a spin-off sequel focusing on Steve Carell's character, with Shadyac and Oedekerk returning to direct and write, and Freeman also reprising his role, was released on June 22, 2007.

Plot

Bruce Nolan is a television field reporter for Eyewitness News on WKBW-TV in Buffalo, New York, but desires to be the news anchorman. When Bruce is insulted by his rival, Evan Baxter, a vulgar on-camera outburst leads to his dismissal from the station. After a series of misfortunes, Bruce complains to God that "He's the one that should be fired".

Bruce receives a message on his pager, which takes him to an empty warehouse where he meets God. God offers to give Bruce his powers to prove that he is doing the job correctly. God tells Bruce that he cannot tell others he has God's powers (in order to avoid the media attention), nor can he use the powers to alter free will. Bruce is initially jubilant with the powers, using them for personal gains, such as getting his job back, exacting revenge on a street gang that bullied him earlier, and impressing his girlfriend, Grace Connelly.

Bruce finds ways of using his powers around Buffalo to cause miraculous events to occur at otherwise mundane events that he covers, such as discovering Jimmy Hoffa's body during a segment on police training, or causing a meteor to harmlessly land near a cook-off, earning him the nickname "Mr. Exclusive". Bruce then causes Evan to embarrass himself on-air, causing Evan to be fired in favor of Bruce as the new anchor. Bruce continues to hear voices in his head and re-encounters God, who explains the voices are prayers that Bruce must deal with. Bruce creates a computerized email-like system to receive the prayers and respond but finds that the influx is far too many for him to handle (despite only receiving prayers from the Buffalo area) and sets the program to answer every prayer Yes automatically.

Bruce attends a party celebrating his promotion. When Grace arrives, she finds Bruce kissing his co-anchor, Susan Ortega, after she forcefully comes on to him, and quickly leaves. Bruce follows her, trying to use his powers to convince her to stay but cannot influence her free will. As Bruce looks around, he realizes that Buffalo has fallen into chaos due to his actions: parts of the city believe the Apocalypse is nearly upon Earth due to the meteor strikes, while a large number of people, all having prayed to win the multi-million dollar lottery and received only seventeen dollars in return, have started rioting in the streets. Bruce returns to God, who explains that he cannot solve all the problems and Bruce must figure out a way himself. Bruce then starts to help others without using his powers, including giving Evan his job back. He returns to his computer at home and goes about answering prayers earnestly. As he reads through them, he finds a prayer from Grace, wishing for his success and well-being. As Bruce reads it, another prayer from Grace arrives, this one wishing not to be in love with him anymore.

Stunned by this development, Bruce walks alone on a highway, asking God to take back his powers and leaving his fate in His hands. Bruce is suddenly hit by a truck and regains consciousness in a white void. God appears, and He asks Bruce what he really wants; Bruce admits that he only wants to make sure Grace finds a man that would make her happy. God agrees, and Bruce finds himself in the hospital, where his doctors help him recover. Grace finally arrives at the hospital and rekindles her relationship with Bruce. Following his recovery, Bruce returns to his field reporting, but decides to take more pleasure in the simple stories at the end of the film.

Cast

 Jim Carrey as Bruce Nolan
 Morgan Freeman as God
 Jennifer Aniston as Grace Connelly, Bruce's girlfriend
 Catherine Bell as Susan Ortega, Bruce's co-anchor
 Steve Carell (credited as Steven Carell) as Evan Baxter, Bruce's rival
 Philip Baker Hall as Jack Baylor
 Lisa Ann Walter as Debbie Connelly, Grace's sister
 Paul Satterfield as Dallas Coleman
 Nora Dunn as Ally Loman
 Eddie Jemison as Bobby
 Sally Kirkland as Anita Mann
 Micah Stephen Williams as boy on bike
 Tony Bennett as himself
 Carlos Sánchez as Juan Valdez
 John Murphy as himself
 Madeline Lovejoy as Zoe
 Noel Gugliemi as Hector
 Annie Wersching as woman at party

Production

In June 2000, it was announced that Universal had paid over $1 million for a spec script titled Bruce Almighty with the intention of positioning the script as a directing vehicle for Tom Shadyac via his Universal based production company Shady Acres. Jim Carrey signed on to star in March 2002 with Steve Oedekerk rewriting the script. Previously, Carrey had been slated to star in another comedy for Universal titled 'Dog Years' to be directed by Gary Ross, but following that film's cancellation, Universal were eager to get Carrey onto another proejct.

Filming of Buffalo was done in the "New York Street" at Universal Studios Hollywood. The restaurant with Tony Bennett was filmed at Cicada, in the James Oviatt Building, downtown Los Angeles. The spa scene with Jennifer Aniston was filmed in the Shoin building at The Japanese Garden in Los Angeles.

Reception

Box office
Bruce Almighty earned $67.9 million during its opening weekend, which made it the highest for a Jim Carrey film, surpassing How the Grinch Stole Christmas, a record it held until the release of Sonic the Hedgehog 2 in 2022. In its first four days, it generated a total of $86.4 million, becoming the second-highest Memorial Day weekend debut, behind The Lost World: Jurassic Park. The film opened in the number 1 spot at the box office, beating The Matrix Reloaded. This would only last for a week, as the spot was taken away by Finding Nemo. The film was released in the United Kingdom on June 27, 2003, and topped the country's box office that weekend.

Bruce Almighty joined The Matrix Reloaded, Finding Nemo, X2 and Pirates of the Caribbean: The Curse of the Black Pearl to become the first five films to earn over $200 million at the box office in one summer season. By the end of its theatrical run, the film had made $242 million domestically and a total $484 million worldwide, making it Aniston and Carrey's highest-grossing film worldwide, as well as the fifth-highest-grossing film of 2003.

Critical response
On Rotten Tomatoes, the film has a score of 48% based on 193 reviews, with an average rating of 5.70/10. The site's critical consensus reads, "Carrey is hilarious in the slapstick scenes, but Bruce Almighty gets bogged down in treacle." On Metacritic, it has a score of 46 out of 100, based on 35 critics, indicating "mixed or average reviews".

Roger Ebert of the Chicago Sun-Times gave the film three out of four stars, calling it: "A charmer, the kind of movie where Bruce learns that while he may not ever make a very good God, the experience may indeed make him a better television newsman." Ebert praised Aniston's performance: "Aniston, as a sweet kindergarten teacher and fiancee, shows again (after "The Good Girl") that she really will have a movie career." Varietys Robert Koehler gave the film a mixed review: "There's remarkably little done with a premise snatched from high-concept heaven, adding yet another file to the growing cabinet of under-realized comedies." The Los Angeles Times gave it a negative review and called it "not so mighty".

Controversies
The film was banned in Egypt because of its portrayal of God as an ordinary man. Bans in both Malaysia and Egypt were eventually lifted after the nations' censorship boards gave the film their highest rating (18-PL in the case of Malaysia).

As God contacts Bruce using an actual phone number rather than one in the standard fictional 555 telephone exchange, several people and groups sharing this number received hundreds of phone calls from people wanting to talk to God, including a church in North Carolina, US (where the minister was named Bruce), a pastor in northern Wisconsin and a man running a sandwich shop in Manchester, England. The producers noted that the number (776-2323) was not in use in the area code (716, which was never specified on screen) in the film's story, but did not check anywhere else. For the home-video and television versions of the film, the number was changed to the fictional 555–0123.

Accolades

Soundtrack

The soundtrack was released on June 3, 2003, by Varèse Sarabande. Tracks 8-13 are from the score composed by John Debney, performed by the Hollywood Studio Symphony (conducted by Pete Anthony) with Brad Dechter and Sandy De Crescent.
Track listing
 "One of Us" - Joan Osborne
 "God Shaped Hole" - Plumb
 "You're a God" - Vertical Horizon
 "The Power" - Snap!
 "A Little Less Conversation" - Elvis vs. JXL
 "The Rockafeller Skank" - Fatboy Slim
 "God Gave Me Everything" - Mick Jagger featuring Lenny Kravitz
 "AB Positive"
 "Walking on Water"
 "Seventh at Seven"
 "Bruce Meets God"
 "Bruce's Prayer"
 "Grace's Prayer"

Related media
 Arai En 305-il Kadavul, a Tamil-language remake
 God Tussi Great Ho, an Indian remake
 The Story of God with Morgan Freeman, a spin-off documentary television series starring Morgan Freeman

Sequel
A sequel and spin-off, titled Evan Almighty, was released on June 22, 2007, with Steve Carell reprising his role as Evan Baxter and Morgan Freeman returning to his role as God. Although Shadyac returned to direct the sequel, neither Carrey nor Aniston were involved with the film, and Carrey's character, Bruce, is never mentioned in the film. The film was a critical and commercial failure.

Proposed sequel
Before Evan Almighty materialized, screenwriters Steve Koren and Mark O’Keefe envisioned a sequel with the title Brucifer. The proposed sequel involved Aniston's character dying and Carrey's character, under the weight of his grief, takes on Satan's powers, which he uses to resurrect Aniston's character.

References

External links

 
 
 

2000s fantasy comedy films
2003 films
2003 comedy films
2003 fantasy films
American fantasy comedy films
Censored films
2000s English-language films
Films about Christianity
Films about God
Films about television
Films about wish fulfillment
Films directed by Tom Shadyac
Films scored by John Debney
Films set in Buffalo, New York
Films shot in Los Angeles
Films with screenplays by Steve Oedekerk
Religious comedy films
Religious controversies in film
Spyglass Entertainment films
Universal Pictures films
2000s American films